The 1913–14 Toronto Hockey Club season was the second season of the Toronto franchise in the National Hockey Association (NHA). The Blue Shirts would win the NHA championship in a playoff to take over the Stanley Cup. The club then played and defeated the Victoria Aristocrats in the first hockey "World Series" against the champion of the Pacific Coast Hockey Association (PCHA).

Off-season 
Bruce Ridpath resigned as general manager of the club prior to the season, replaced by the owner Percy Quinn. Jack Marshall returned as coach. Ridpath himself tried out as a player but gave up his comeback before the season started. Of the previous season's squad, Archie McLean was dropped and Frank Nighbor moved to British Columbia. Jack Walker, who had played one game with Toronto in the previous season before playing in the Maritime league was added. Con Corbeau was acquired from the Toronto Ontarios just before the start of the season.

Regular season 

Harry Cameron suffered a separated shoulder and the Torontos acquired George McNamara from the Ontarios for cash in mid-season. The Torontos had a two-game lead in the standings with two games to go, but lost both to drop into a tie with the Montreal Canadiens. It was rumoured that the Torontos had thrown the last two games to get an extra home game from a final with Montreal.

Final standings

Schedule and results

NHA playoffs 
Tied at the top of the standings, the Blueshirts and Canadiens faced off in a two-game, total goals series for the league championship and Stanley Cup. The Blueshirts won the series 6–2.

Toronto 6, Montreal Canadiens 2

Stanley Cup playoffs 
The 1913–14 season marked the end of the challenge era in Stanley Cup history. After dispatching the Canadiens, the Blueshirts faced off against the Victoria Aristocrats of the Pacific Coast Hockey Association (PCHA) in a best-of-five series, with all games played at the Arena Gardens. As one of the duties of the hockey commission for the NHA, PCHA and Maritime leagues, the playoff with the PCHA had been arranged prior to the season, but it had not been cleared with the Stanley Cup trustees. A controversy erupted when a letter arrived from the Stanley Cup trustees on March 17, that the trustees would not let the Stanley Cup travel west, as they did not consider Victoria a proper challenger because they had not formally notified the trustees. However, on March 18, Trustee William Foran stated that it was a misunderstanding. PCHA president Frank Patrick had not filed a challenge, because he had expected Emmett Quinn of the NHA to make all of the arrangements in his role as hockey commissioner, whereas the trustees thought they were being deliberately ignored. In any case, all arrangements had been ironed out and the Victoria challenge was accepted. The trustees later sent a letter to league executives that Stanley Cup playoff arrangements would be handled by the leagues themselves henceforth.

Total attendance for the series was 14,260, out of a possible 22,500 (including standing room) capacity at the Arena. At the time, professional hockey was less of a draw than Ontario Hockey Association (OHA) senior hockey. Two games between local OHA senior teams had drawn over 14,000. The Torontos players and staff received $297 each as their share of the gate receipts.

Toronto 3, Victoria 0

See also 
 1913–14 NHA season

References 
 
 
Notes

Toronto Blueshirts seasons
Toronto Hockey Club season, 1913-14
Stanley Cup championship seasons